The Qara Oasis (also spelt Cara or Gara; ; also Qarat Umm El Sagheir, i.e. ) is an inhabited oasis in Egypt, with a population of only 363 (as of the 11 November 2006 census). This oasis is often disregarded when it comes to counting the number of Egyptian oases as it is very small compared to the others. In local folklore, if a newborn arrives, an elder will die shortly after, thus keeping the population constant.

History 
Originally, the inhabitants lived atop a neighbouring mountain which acted as a natural fortress, but today they live in simple houses beneath.

At first, the people of the village built a fortress on top of a nearby rocky mountain, which was a defensive position that would protect them from hostiles. The main industry was the production of dates and olives.

The village itself is an archaeological site, built with “Kershef” material, which is made of silt mixed with salt

Environment 
Among the features of the oasis are thick, high salinity springs that have been known since the Roman era, and a hot water spring called “Kefara”, whose temperature reaches 70 degrees Celsius, which are transformed into cooling basins for use in agriculture and the people's consumption, and ancient ruins located at the top of the adjacent mountain, and a market where environmental products are displayed. And handicrafts. One of the distinctive dishes of the villagers is “Al-Aqrouz”, which is the palm tree, which is traditionally served to the most important guests.

Demography 
The oasis is almost uninhabited, the population was 363 people as of 2006.

Economy 
There is no service coverage for the area.

Because the oasis is not connected to the national electricity grid, solar cells provide the energy needed for street lighting and home use, and diesel generators. It has a school for basic education, and it was declared the first illiteracy-free village in Matrouh Governorate in 2009, but it lacks a medical unit and relief convoys frequent it to provide basic medical services. There is one singular car for supply runs.

In Popular Culture 
The oasis appears in the 1958 war film Ice Cold in Alex.

Sources
 LookLex: Qara, Beyond Space and Time
 Wikivoyage (German)

References 
Gara:A Forgotten Oasis in Egypt’s Western Desert by Mohamed Kenawi and Francesca Simi

https://www.whsmith.co.uk/products/gara-a-forgotten-oasis-in-egypts-western-desert/mohamed-kenawi/francesca-simi/paperback/9781739660109.html

Oases of Egypt